Dialypetalantheae, synonym Condamineeae, is a tribe of flowering plants in the family Rubiaceae and contains about 305 species in 31 genera. Most genera are found in Central and Southern Tropical America, but a few occur in Southeast Asia.

Taxonomy
The tribe was first described, as Condamineeae, by George Bentham and Joseph Dalton Hooker in 1873. A change in the International Code of Nomenclature for algae, fungi, and plants in 2011 extended the conservation of family names to subtaxa that include the type of the conserved family name. As Dialypetalanthaceae is a conserved name, based on the genus Dialypetalanthus, any tribe that includes this genus must be called Dialypetalantheae. The name was published by James L. Reveal in 2012.

Genera 
Currently accepted names

 Alseis Schott (18 sp.) - Southern Mexico to Southern Tropical America
 Bathysa C.Presl (10 sp.) - Southern Tropical America
 Bothriospora Hook.f. (1 sp.) - Southern Tropical America
 Calycophyllum DC. (11 sp.) - Mexico to Tropical America
 Capirona Spruce (1 sp.) - Southern Tropical America
 Chimarrhis Jacq. (15 sp.) - Tropical America
 Condaminea DC. (5 sp.) - Central and Southern Tropical America
 Dialypetalanthus Kuhlm. (1 sp.) - Southern Tropical America
 Dioicodendron Steyerm. (1 sp.) - Andes
 Dolichodelphys K.Schum. & K.Krause (1 sp.) - Venezuela, Colombia, Ecuador, Peru
 Dolicholobium A.Gray (28 sp.) - Central Malesia to Southwestern Pacific
 Elaeagia Wedd. (25 sp.) - Mexico to Tropical America
 Emmenopterys Oliv. (2 sp.) - China, Myanmar, Thailand, Vietnam
 Ferdinandusa Pohl (24 sp.) - Tropical America
 Hippotis Ruiz & Pav. (12 sp.) - Central and Southern Tropical America
 Lintersemina Humberto Mend., Celis & M.A.González
 Macbrideina Standl. (1 sp.) - Colombia, Ecuador, Peru
 Macrocnemum P.Browne (6 sp.) - Tropical America
 Mastixiodendron Melch. (7 sp.) - Maluku Islands, Bismarck Archipelago, Papua New Guinea, Solomon Islands, Fiji
 Mussaendopsis Baill. (3 sp.) - Malesia
 Parachimarrhis Ducke (1 sp.) - Southern Tropical America
 Pentagonia Benth. (37 sp.) - Central and Southern Tropical America
 Picardaea Urb. (1 sp.) - Caribbean
 Pinckneya Michx. (1 sp.) - Southeastern U.S.A.
 Pogonopus Klotzsch (3 sp.) - Tropical America
 Rustia Klotzsch (17 sp.) - Tropical America
 Schizocalyx Wedd. (9 sp.) - Costa Rica to Southern Tropical America
 Simira Aubl. (44 sp.) - Mexico to Southern Tropical America
 Sommera Schltdl. (10 sp.) - Mexico to Peru
 Tammsia H.Karst. (1 sp.) - Western South America to Venezuela
 Warszewiczia Klotzsch (8 sp.) - Tropical America
 Wittmackanthus Kuntze (1 sp.) - Panama to Southern Tropical America

Synonyms

 Arariba Mart. = Simira
 Blandibractea Wernham = Simira
 Calderonia Standl. = Simira
 Carmenocania Wernham = Pogonopus
 Chrysoxylon Wedd. = Pogonopus
 Creaghia Scort. = Mussaendopsis
 Dorisia Gillespie = Mastixiodendron
 Eukylista Benth. & Hook.f. = Calycophyllum
 Eukylista Benth. = Calycophyllum
 Exandra Standl. = Simira
 Henlea H.Karst. = Rustia
 Holtonia Standl. = Simira
 Howardia Klotzsch = Pogonopus
 Lasionema D.Don = Macrocnemum
 Loretoa Standl. = Capirona
 Megaphyllum Spruce ex Baill. = Pentagonia
 Monadelphanthus H.Karst. = Capirona
 Nothophlebia Standl. = Pentagonia
 Pallasia Klotzsch = Wittmackanthus
 Phitopis Hook.f. = Schizocalyx
 Pinknea Pers. = Pinckneya
 Pseudochimarrhis Ducke = Chimarrhis
 Schoenleinia Klotzsch = Bathysa
 Seemannia Hook. = Pentagonia
 Semaphyllanthe L.Andersson = Calycophyllum
 Sickingia Willd. = Simira
 Sprucea Benth. = Simira
 Stomandra Standl. = Rustia
 Striolaria Ducke = Pentagonia
 Tepesia C.F.Gaertn. = Bothriospora
 Tresanthera H.Karst. = Rustia
 Voigtia Klotzsch = Bathysa
 Watsonamra Kuntze = Pentagonia
 Wernhamia S.Moore = Simira

References 

 
Ixoroideae tribes